Paul Gerard Lane is a Canadian politician in the provincial legislature of Newfoundland and Labrador, Canada. He represents the electoral district of Mount Pearl-Southlands in the Newfoundland and Labrador House of Assembly.

Prior to entering politics, Lane worked as an occupational health and safety professional and disability claims manager.

Politics
Born and raised in St. John's, Newfoundland and Labrador, Lane resides in the suburban community of Mount Pearl, where he was a city councillor and deputy mayor prior to his election to the provincial legislature.

Lane was first elected in the 2011 provincial election as a member of the Progressive Conservative Party of Newfoundland and Labrador (PC). Following the election of a PC majority government in 2011, Lane was not appointed to the Cabinet. On January 20, 2014 Lane crossed the floor to the Liberal Party to protest the leadership of Premier Kathy Dunderdale. After leaving the PCs Lane apologized for his behavior in the House of Assembly and on social media, and distanced himself from the policies of the PCs, especially his prior outspoken support for curtailing access to information with Bill 29 and for the Muskrat Falls project.

Following the election of a Liberal majority government in 2015, Lane sat as a backbencher. In 2016, he was suspended from the Liberal caucus for voting with the opposition on a non-binding motion against the 2016 budget. Lane served as Chair of Committees. As an Independent he frequently votes in support of the positions put forward by NDP MHAs.

After he left the Liberal Party, media reports surfaced that Lane was being sued for $28,000 in credit card arrears.

Lane won re-election in the 2019 provincial election as an Independent candidate. He was re-elected again in the 2021 provincial election.

On January 13, 2022, Lane announced on Facebook that he tested positive for COVID-19.

Electoral record 

|-

|-

|-

|-

|}

|-

|-

|-

|}

|-

|-

|NDP
|John Riche
|align="right"|1,675
|align="right"|38.51
|align="right"|+31.78
|-

|}

References

External links
Paul Lane

Living people
Independent MHAs in Newfoundland and Labrador
Progressive Conservative Party of Newfoundland and Labrador MHAs
Liberal Party of Newfoundland and Labrador MHAs
People from Mount Pearl
Politicians from St. John's, Newfoundland and Labrador
Newfoundland and Labrador municipal councillors
21st-century Canadian politicians
Year of birth missing (living people)